Derxia gummosa  is a Gram-negative, rod-shaped, nitrogen-fixing, obligate aerobe bacterium of the genus Derxia. Colonies of D. gummosa produce a tenacious gum.

References

External links
Type strain of Derxia gummosa at BacDive -  the Bacterial Diversity Metadatabase

Burkholderiales
Bacteria described in 1960